Kayhan Kalhor (born 24 November 1964) is an Iranian-Kurdish kamancheh and setar player and vocal composer. He has received three Grammy Award for Best Traditional World Music Album nominations. Kalhor also has earned two nominations and won one Grammy Award for Best Global Music Album as a member of the Silk Road Ensemble.

Early life and education
Kayhan Kalhor was born in Tehran to a Kurdish family. He began studying music at the age of seven. By the age of thirteen, he was playing in the National Orchestra of Radio and Television of Iran. Continuing his music studies under various teachers, he studied in the Iranian radif tradition and also travelled to study in the northern part of Khorasan province, where music traditions have Kurdish and Turkic influences as well as Persian. At a musical conservatory in Tehran, Kalhor worked under the directorship of Mohammad-Reza Lotfi who is from the north-east of Iran. Kalhor also travelled in the northwestern provinces of Iran. At age 17, he left Iran and moved to Italy to study music in Rome. He migrated to Italy by land, walking through Turkey, Romania, and Yugoslavia, picking up menial farm work along the way to support himself. After studying music in Rome, he moved to Canada, where he graduated from the music program at Carleton University in Ottawa.

Four years after Kalhor left Iran, his parents and brother were killed in an Iraqi missile attack during the Iran-Iraq War.

Career

Kalhor has a wide range of musical influences, uses several musical instruments, and crosses cultural borders with his work, but at his center he is an intense player of the Kamancheh. In his playing Kalhor often pins Iranian classical music structures to the rich folk modes and melodies of the Kurdish tradition of Iran.

Kalhor has composed works for and played alongside the famous Iranian vocalists Mohammad Reza Shajarian and Shahram Nazeri. He has also composed and performed with the Indian sitar player Shujaat Husain Khan and Indian tabla player Swapan Chaudhuri in the group Ghazal. Kalhor's 2004 album In the mirror of the Sky was a joint venture with the Iranian lute player Ali Akbar Moradi. His 2006 album The Wind is a collaboration with the Turkish baglama virtuoso Erdal Erzincan, with both Turkish and Persian pieces performed. At other times Kalhor has collaborated with Yo-Yo Ma's Silk Road Project Ensemble in the US and the Kronos Quartet.

In 1991, after having graduated from Carleton University and obtained Canadian citizenship, Kalhor moved to the United States, settling in Brooklyn, New York City, and became commercially successful. By the late 1990s, he was recording solo albums that grew into collaborations with other artists. In 2000, he was invited to Massachusetts for a collaboration with dozens of international musicians, a project which grew into the Silk Road Ensemble. Two of his works were nominated for Grammy Awards in 2004.

Kalhor returned to Iran in 2002 due to increased anti-Muslim sentiment in the US following the September 11 attacks. There, he settled in Tehran and met his partner Zohreh Soltanabadi. Although he had intended to stay in Iran, he decided to leave in the aftermath of the 2009 Iranian presidential election protests and returned to the United States with Soltanabadi, where they married and settled in Cherry Valley, California.

In 2010 Kalhor composed "I was there", which was based "on a melody attributed to Ziryab, a ninth-century Iranian musician", for a Maya Beiser concert. This piece was performed by Kalhor alongside Maya Beiser, the renowned cellist Bassam Saba, an oud player, and two percussionists, Glen Velez and Matt Kilmer.

Kalhor and Soltanabadi attempted to gain permanent residency in the United States. However, shortly after their wedding, Soltanabadi's father died and she had to return to Iran to care for her mother. For the next few years they saw each other mostly by Skype and sometimes met abroad. Kalhor eventually had his application for permanent residency granted. In 2017, Soltanabadi applied for residency in the US but was refused. That same year, Kalhor was informed that the US authorities were considering revoking his legal status as a US resident. Kalhor subsequently returned to Iran. He and Soltanabadi currently live in Tehran, but he still visits the United States to give performances.

Discography

† Nominated for a Grammy Award

§ Won a Grammy Award

See also 
 Silk Road Project, Silk Road Ensemble
 Dastgah
 Music of Iran

References

External links

Kayhan Kalhor's website

Video: Kayhan Kalhor speaking as an ensemble member of Silk Road Ensemble, December 2008, 13 min.

1963 births
Iranian kamancheh players
Kurdish musicians
Living people
People from Kermanshah
Musicians from Kermanshah
Iranian classical musicians
Carleton University alumni
20th-century Iranian people
21st-century Iranian people
Iranian Kurdish people